Jesús Lorenzo (1906 – death unknown) was a Cuban pitcher in the Negro leagues in 1929 and 1930. 

A native of Havana, Cuba, Lorenzo made his Negro leagues debut in 1929 for the Cuban Stars (West), and played with the Stars again the following year. In each season, he appeared in 12 games, posting a 5–6 record in 1929, and a 4–5 record in 1930.

References

External links
 and Seamheads

1906 births
Date of birth missing
Year of death missing
Place of death missing
Cuban Stars (West) players
Baseball pitchers
Baseball players from Havana